Schudson is a surname. Notable people with the surname include:

Charles B. Schudson (born 1950), American lawyer and judge
Michael Schudson (born 1946), American sociologist

Americanized surnames